Reinhard Friedrich Michael Mey (born 21 December 1942) is a German Liedermacher (a German-style singer-songwriter). In France he is known as Frédérik Mey.

By 2009, Mey had released 27 German albums, and generally releases a new album approximately every two years; his first album was Ich wollte wie Orpheus singen (1967); the most recent studio album is Das Haus an der Ampel (2020). His biggest success to date was Mein Achtel Lorbeerblatt (1972). His most famous song by far is "Über den Wolken" (1974), which has been covered by numerous German artists. Mey is known to embark upon an extensive concert tour every two or three years, with a live album released from each tour.

Biography 
Reinhard Mey was born on 21 December 1942, in Berlin, Germany, where he spent his childhood. At the age of 12, he had his first piano lesson, and at the age of 14 he got his first guitar. He taught himself how to play the trumpet. During his school years he gained performance experience by playing Skiffle music with friends. In 1965, Mey was offered the chance to perform at a Liedermacher festival at Waldeck Castle, a converted castle ruin. This led to his first recording contract. In 1961, he became part of the group Les Trois Affamés, with Schobert Schulz.

In 1963, Mey graduated from the French Gymnasium in Berlin, receiving the German Abitur as well as the French Baccalauréat, and thereafter began vocational training as an industrial trader at Schering AG Berlin. He broke off his university studies in economics in order to concentrate on songwriting and singing, and has been a successful performer in Germany, in France, and in the Netherlands ever since. He has written songs in German, French, Dutch and English. He records his French material under the name of Frédérik Mey. In 1967, he married a French woman named Christine. Their marriage was dissolved in 1976.

Today, Mey lives in Berlin-Frohnau in his second marriage (since 1977) to Hella Hennies (born in Hanover), and had three children in the marriage: Frederik (born 20 November 1976), Maximilian (born 28 January 1982; died May 2014), and Victoria-Luise (born 19 November 1985).

His son Maximilian died in May 2014 after five years in a persistent vegetative state. Undiagnosed severe pneumonia had led to a cardio-pulmonary arrest, from which Maximilian was resuscitated after eight minutes of hypoxia.

Lyrics and political views
Mey writes both sensitive and humorous songs, with subject matter taken mostly from his everyday life and surroundings. His themes include life on the road, his hobbies (e.g., flying), childhood memories, his family life and surroundings, and occasionally politics.

Mey's politics tend to be moderate to left-leaning. He speaks out in particular for freedom and non-violence, and not only in his songs (for example, he participated in a demonstration at the beginning of 2003 against the coming war in Iraq). Nevertheless, his Annabelle criticises female political correct deadly-serious non-serene activism; Mey is said later to have repented of it and wrote another song in response to himself. Strongly influenced by the French chanson, Mey's political songs were relatively scarce among his works at the beginning, but they have increased in quantity over time, such that there is usually at least one song on each new album about politics. His 2004 album, Nanga Parbat, for example, includes "Alles OK in Guantanamo Bay", a song critical of the U.S. detention facility in Cuba.

For years, Mey has been an avid vegetarian, and also has been active in the German chapter of the organisation People for the Ethical Treatment of Animals (PETA). Several of his songs deal with the theme of prevention of cruelty to animals, the most famous one being "Die Würde des Schweins ist unantastbar" (roughly, "a pig's dignity is inviolable.", echoing the first sentence of the first article of the German constitution)

Theme music
The first bars of Reinhard Mey's Gute Nacht, Freunde have been used since 1976 as the beginning of the theme tune for the popular Dutch radio show Met het Oog op Morgen, broadcast every night from 23:00 until midnight on Radio 1. After the words "und ein letztes Glas im steh'n", the Mey song fades away and an orchestra takes over.

Awards 
1968 Prix International de la Chanson française (the first non-French singer to receive this award)
1983 Verdienstkreuz am Bande (Cross of Merit on ribbon)
2001 Verdienstkreuz 1. Klasse (Cross of Merit, First class)

Selected discography

German

Studio albums
1967 – Ich wollte wie Orpheus singen
1968 – Ankomme Freitag, den 13.
1970 – Aus meinem Tagebuch
1971 – Ich bin aus jenem Holze
1972 – Mein achtel Lorbeerblatt
1974 – Wie vor Jahr und Tag
1975 – Ikarus
1977 – Menschenjunges
1979 – Keine ruhige Minute
1980 – Jahreszeiten
1981 – Freundliche Gesichter
1983 – Die Zwölfte
1985 – Hergestellt in Berlin
1986 – Alleingang
1988 – Balladen
1990 – Farben
1992 – Alles geht
1994 – Immer weiter
1996 – Leuchtfeuer
1998 – Flaschenpost
2000 – Einhandsegler
2002 – Rüm Hart
2004 – Nanga Parbat
2007 – Bunter Hund
2010 – Mairegen
2013 – Dann mach's gut
2016 – Mr. Lee
2020 – Das Haus an der Ampel

Live albums
 1971 – Reinhard Mey live
 1974 – 20.00 Uhr
 1978 – Unterwegs
 1981 – Tournee
 1984 – Live '84
 1987 – Die grosse Tournee '86
 1991 – Mit Lust und Liebe
 1995 – Zwischen Zürich und zu Haus
 1997 – Lebenszeichen
 1999 – Lampenfieber
 2002 – Solo – Die Einhandsegler Tournee
 2003 – Klaar Kiming
 2006 – !ich kann
 2009 – Danke Liebe Gute Fee
 2012 – Gib mir Musik!
 2015 – dann mach's gut Live
 2018 – Mr. Lee Live

Compilation albums
 1973 – Mädchen in den Schänken (Compilation of 7" 45rpm singles)
 1973 – Alles was ich habe
 1977 – Starportrait
 1982 – Starportrait 2, Welch ein Geschenk ist ein Lied
 1987 – Die großen Erfolge
 1989 – Mein Apfelbäumchen
 1990 – Die Story (6-CD-Release Bertelsmann Buchclub)
 1993 – Ich liebe dich
 1997 – Du bist ein Riese ...
 2000 – Peter und der Wolf / Tierballaden
 2003 – Über den Wolken – Lieder aus 4 Jahrzehnten
 2005 – Frei!
 2013 – Jahreszeiten
 2015 – Lieder von Freunden

Singles
1965 – Geh und fang den Wind / Drei Lilien (Debut single; German cover version of Donovans "Catch The Wind" under the pseudonym Rainer May)
1966 – 25 00 30 Fred Kasulzke protestazki / Frau Pohl / Vertreterbesuch / Ballade / Bauer ich bitt euch (EP)
1966 – Die drei Musketiere / Schuttabladeplatz der Zeit / Abgesang / Mein Kanapee (EP)
1968 – Diplomatenjagd / Komm, giess mein Glas noch einmal ein
1969 – Ich hab' nur Dich gekannt / Der Weg zurück
1970 – Die Ballade vom Pfeifer / Ankomme, Freitag, den 13.
1970 – In meinem Zimmer fällt leis' der Regen / Ein Krug aus Stein
1971 – Die heisse Schlacht am kalten Buffet / Neun... und vorbei
1971 – Der Mörder ist immer der Gärtner / Längst geschlossen sind die Läden
1972 – Annabelle, ach Annabelle / Bevor ich mit den Wölfen heule
1973 – Trilogie auf Frau Pohl / Das Geheimnis im Hefeteig oder der Schuss im Backofen
1973 – Aber Deine Ruhe findest Du nicht mehr / Zwei Hühner auf dem Weg nach Vorgestern
1974 – Mann aus Alemannia / Über den Wolken
1974 – Gute Nacht Freunde / Musikanten sind in der Stadt
1974 – Über den Wolken / Der alte Bär ist tot und sein Käfig leer
1975 – Es gibt Tage, da wünscht' ich, ich wär' mein Hund / Es bleibt eine Narbe zurück
1975 – Hab Erdöl im Garten / Ich bin Klempner von Beruf
1977 – Ist mir das peinlich / Mein erstes graues Haar
1977 – Einen Antrag auf Erteilung eines Antragsformulars / Menschenjunges
1978 – Daddy Blue / Alles ist gut
1979 – Keine ruhige Minute / Dieter Malinek, Ulla und ich
1979 – Dr. Nahtlos, Dr. Sägeberg und Dr. Hein / Was weiss ich schon von Dir?
1980 – Wir sind lauter arme, kleine Würstchen / Freunde, lasst uns trinken
1980 – Sommermorgen / Bei Ilse und Willi auf'm Land
1981 – Müllmänner-Blues / Das Leben ist ...
1983 – Was in der Zeitung steht / Ich würde gern einmal in Dresden singen
1983 – Hilf mir / Ich habe nie mehr Langeweile
1984 – Rundfunkwerbung-Blues
1984 – Frohe Weihnacht / Alles ist so schön verpackt
1985 – Lasst sie reisen / Ich grüsse ...
1990 – Alle Soldaten woll'n nach Haus'  
1986 – Nein, meine Söhne geb' ich nicht 
1992 – Das Etikett (Promo-Single)
1994 – 51er Kapitän
1996 – Lilienthals Traum
1998 – Die 12 Weihnachtstage (Adaptation of the British Christmas song "The Twelve Days of Christmas") / Willst Du Dein Herz mir schenken
2000 – Einhandsegler
2000 – Ich bring' Dich durch die Nacht (Promo-Single)

With other artists 
1986 – Ein Loch in der Kanne (Live with Rainhard Fendrich)
1996 – Liebe, Schnaps & Tod (with Hannes Wader and Klaus Hoffmann)
1999 – Einfach abhau'n, einfach geh'n (Maxi-CD, with Ina Deter)
2003 – Mey, Wader, Wecker – Das Konzert (live with Hannes Wader and Konstantin Wecker)

DVDs
2003 – Klaar Kiming
2009 – Danke liebe gute Fee

British albums
1970 – One Vote for tomorrow

French albums

Studio
1968 – Frédérik Mey, Vol. 1
1972 – Frédérik Mey, Vol. 2
1974 – Frédérik Mey, Vol. 3
1976 – Frédérik Mey, Vol. 4
1979 – Frédérik Mey, Vol. 5
1982 – Frédérik Mey, Vol. 6
2005 – Frédérik Mey, Vol. 7 – douce France

Live 
1976 – Recital Frédérik Mey à l'Olympia
1979 – Bobino

Dutch singles
1975 – Als de dag van toen
1976 – Vergeef me als je kunt

References

External links 
Official homepage of Reinhard Mey
Reinhard Mey – www.laut.de
Source of many Reinhard Mey's recordings
Herbstgewitter spezial: Reinhard Mey im Interview. - interview of Reinhard Mey at the singer and song writer magazine Ein Achtel Lorbeerblatt (audio, German, 95 mins)

1942 births
Living people
German songwriters
German male singers
French-language singers
Dutch-language singers
Officers Crosses of the Order of Merit of the Federal Republic of Germany
Recipients of the Order of Merit of Berlin
Musicians from Berlin
Französisches Gymnasium Berlin alumni
People from Reinickendorf